This article lists the complete results of the group stage of the 2008 Uber Cup in Jakarta, Indonesia.

Group W

China vs. United States

Germany vs. United States

China vs. Germany

A fallen bulb from the overhead lights cause the remaining fourth and fifth match abandoned, after the discussion, China takes walkover for fourth match while Germany takes walkover for fifth match.

Group X

Korea vs. South Africa

Hong Kong vs. South Africa

Korea vs. Hong Kong

Group Y

Malaysia vs. New Zealand

Denmark vs. New Zealand

Malaysia vs. Denmark

Group Z

Japan vs. Indonesia

Japan vs. Netherlands

Indonesia vs. Netherlands

References

Uber Cup Group Stage, 2008